The 1989 Champion Hurdle was a horse race held at Cheltenham Racecourse on Tuesday 14 March 1989. It was the 60th running of the Champion Hurdle.

The winner was Tony Geake's Beech Road, a seven-year-old chestnut gelding trained in Hampshire by Toby Balding and ridden by Richard Guest. Beech Road's victory was a first in the race for jockey, trainer and owner.

Beech Road had established himself as a useful handicap hurdler in his early career but failed to complete the course when tried over fences on two occasions in the early part of the 1988/1989 National Hunt season. He was switched back to hurdling and earned a place in the championship with a twenty length win in the National Spirit Hurdle at Fontwell Racecourse in February. In the 1989 Champion Hurdle he started a 50/1 outsider and won by two lengths from Celtic Chief, with the 1988 winner Celtic Shot in third place. The 11/8 favourite Kribensis finished seventh. Twelve of the fifteen runners completed the course.

Race details
 Sponsor: Waterford Crystal
 Purse: £83,614; First prize: £50,206
 Going: Good to Soft
 Distance: 2 miles
 Number of runners: 15
 Winner's time: 4m 02.10

Full result

 Abbreviations: nse = nose; nk = neck; hd = head; dist = distance; UR = unseated rider; PU = pulled up; LFT = left at start; SU = slipped up; BD = brought down

Winner's details
Further details of the winner, Beech Road
 Sex: Gelding
 Foaled: 8 April 1982
 Country: United Kingdom
 Sire: Nearly A Hand; Dam: North Bovey (Flush Royal)
 Owner: Tony Geake
 Breeder: J. Tilling

References

Champion Hurdle
1989
Champion Hurdle
Champion Hurdle
Champion Hurdle, 1090